Rupertus is a surname. Notable people with the surname include:

Glenn Rupertus, Canadian former biathlete
Jacob Rupertus (1822/1823–1921), American handgun designer and manufacturer
William H. Rupertus (1889–1945), American major general in the United States Marine Corps

See also
Rupertus Meldenius, aka Peter Meiderlin and Peter Meuderlinus, (1582 1651), German  Lutheran theologian and educator
Rupertus Tuitensis (c. 1075/1080 – c. 1129), Belgian benedictine theologian, exegete and writer on liturgical and musical topics
 was a Gearing-class destroyer of the United States Navy

References